Karen Hassan (born 31 July 1981) is a Northern Irish actress, born in Belfast, Northern Ireland. From 2010 until 2013 she played Lynsey Nolan in the main series of Hollyoaks. Her other work includes the series Hollyoaks Later, The Fall, and Vikings, as well as the film Hunger.
She also appeared in American TV Series FBI: International in 2022.

Career

Hollyoaks
The character of Lynsey was created as the former girlfriend of Kris Fisher (Gerard McCarthy) and was intended to feature only in Hollyoaks Later, a spin-off from the Hollyoaks series. In June 2010, it was announced that three new characters; Brendan Brady (Emmett J. Scanlan), Bart McQueen (Jonny Clarke) and Lynsey were to join Hollyoaks in August.

Of the castings, Hollyoaks series producer Paul Marquess said: "This is a really exciting time for Hollyoaks and Brendan, Lynsey and Bart bring more fun, drama and sexiness to the show." Hassan moved from Belfast to Liverpool, where Hollyoaks is filmed, for the role. In an interview with the official Hollyoaks website, Hassan said that she was "dead chuffed" after being told that Lynsey would be appearing in Hollyoaks. Hassan's character was found murdered in a Hollyoaks episode which was broadcast on 29 June 2012.

Filmography

References

External links 
 
 Agency Dealers profile
 

1981 births
Living people
Actresses from Belfast
Film actresses from Northern Ireland
Television actresses from Northern Ireland
21st-century actresses from Northern Ireland
Soap opera actresses from Northern Ireland